Wannes Van Laer (born 5 March 1985 in Ostend) is a professional Belgian sailor. He competed at the 2012 Summer Olympics in the Men's Laser class, where he finished in 34th place. Since 2013 he became Belgian Champion Laser Standard for the sixth time.

Van Laer sails under the colours of the Wallonia-Brussels Federation, for the FFYB.

World ranking
Highest position on the ISAF world ranking so far (updated: 17 juni 2013): 16th

Results

Laser Standard

Other classes

References

External links
 
 
 
 

1985 births
Living people
Belgian male sailors (sport)
Olympic sailors of Belgium
Sailors at the 2012 Summer Olympics – Laser
Sportspeople from Ostend
Sailors at the 2016 Summer Olympics – Laser
Sailors at the 2020 Summer Olympics – Laser